The John Aniello Award for Outstanding Emerging Theatre Company is a theatreWashington
Helen Hayes Award for theatre excellence in the Washington, D.C., area.  Established in 2006, the award winners are listed for each year.
 2019 - Ally Theatre Company
 2018 - Monumental Theatre Company
 2017 - Mosaic Theater Company
 2016 - The Welders
 2015 - Flying V
 2014 - Pointless Theatre Company
 2013 - Dizzy Miss Lizzie's Roadside Revue
 2012 - Faction of Fools Theatre Company
 2011 - No Rules Theatre Company;   Factory 449: a theatre collective
 2010 - 1st Stage
 2009 - Constellation Theatre Company
 2008 - Punk Theatre Company

References 

American theater awards